, aka Attack Girls' Swim Team vs. The Undead, is a 2007 Japanese erotic horror film.

Plot
A lab mix-up accidentally swaps a vaccine with a virus that turns a high school full of students and teachers into flesh-eating zombies. But all is not lost: New student Aki discovers that the swim team is immune to the plague. With the school rampaged by ravenous monsters, the girls engage in an over-the-top orgy of gory violence to save the day. Sasa Handa, Yuria Hidaka and Hiromitsu Kiba star in this comic creature feature.

Cast 
 Sasa Handa – Aki
 Yuria Hidaka – Sayaka
 Ayumi Tokitō – Mariko
 Mizuka Arai 
 Hiromitsu Kiba

External links
 

2007 films
Japanese horror films
2000s Japanese-language films
2007 horror films
Japanese splatter films
2000s Japanese films